North Bridge House School is a private school located in London for children aged 2 to 18-year-olds. The school has six different locations for different age groups. The Nursery School, in Hampstead on Fitzjohn's Avenue, is for 2 to 4-year-olds.  The Pre-Preparatory School is just around the corner on Netherhall Gardens and is for 47 year olds, and the Nursery and Pre-Preparatory School on Fordwych Road in West Hampstead is for 2 to 7-year-olds. North Bridge House Preparatory School on Gloucester Avenue near Regent's Park is for 4 to 13-year-olds.  North Bridge House also has two Senior School campuses, one in Hampstead for 11 to 16-year-olds and one in Canonbury, Islington for 11 to 18-year-olds.

The Executive Headteacher of the Nursery and Pre-Prep Schools is Christine McLelland. The Headteacher of the Prep School is James Stenning. The Executive Headteacher of the Senior Schools in Hampstead and Canonbury is Brendan Pavey.
 the school is owned and operated by the Cognita group, founded in 2004.

History
In 1939, North Bridge House School was founded as a Junior and Preparatory school in St John's Wood. By the 1950s, the school had moved to 8 Neatherhall Gardens, Hampstead, which today houses the Pre-Prep (Junior) school. A reorganisation of the school during the 1960s resulted in the move of older Prep-School students to two Nash houses near Regent's Park. Around the same time, the nursery was opened in a Victorian villa on Fitzjohn's avenue, where it continues to operate today.

Later, in 1987, the whole Prep-School was moved to a former convent in Gloucester Avenue, Primrose Hill, previously occupied by the Japanese School of London, and at the same time, the Senior School was established, allowing students to continue their studies at North Bridge House up to the age of 16.

In 2012, the Royal School, Hampstead, was merged with North Bridge House, its former location now the Hampstead Senior School. £3.5m was invested in the redevelopment of the school, allowing for the refurbishment of the whole site, and the addition of specialist teaching facilities.

£1.7m was invested to provide the addition of a sports hall, which was completed in 2014, and opened by former Olympic Triple Jumper, Jonathan Edwards.

In the same year, the North Bridge House Sixth Form was founded. It is situated in a 500-year-old Grade II listed building in Canonbury, Islington, preparing students for university entry. This later expanded to include a senior school.

Ofsted inspections found the preparatory school good in 2008 and outstanding in 2011, the latest reported .

The school 
North Bridge House school, operated by Cognita, is a mixed-ability school; admissions include an examination and interview by the headteacher. The school accepts international students, who come from other Cognita schools. In 2018, the Canonbury school achieved 70% 7-9 grades at GCSE, and 29% A-A* at A Level, and the Hampstead Senior School achieved 56% 7–9 at GCSE.

The cost of attending the senior school in 2018 was £19,200 or £22,830 for international students, including compulsory lunch, whilst the cost for attending the sixth form was £19,335. Scholarships are offered.

North Bridge House includes a Nursery, Pre-Prep, Prep, Senior and Sixth Form, covering all pre-university ages.

Old Northbridgeans (former pupils)

Jamie Reuben (born 1986), British heir and financier
Harry Mount (born 1971), author and journalist
Andrew Eder (born 1964), dean and professor at the University of Buckingham

References

External links 
 
 Profile at the Good Schools Guide

1939 establishments in England
Cognita
Educational institutions established in 1939
Private co-educational schools in London
Private schools in the London Borough of Camden
Private schools in the London Borough of Islington
Schools in Hampstead